Orphnaecus philippinus, known as the Philippine Tangerine,  Philippine Orange, or Neon Orange Tarantula is a species of tarantula. It is native to the Philippines. It was described in 1999, by Gunter Schmidt, as Selenobrachys philippinus, but in 2012, Rick West, Steven Nunn and Henry Hogg made the genus Selenobrachys a junior synonym of Orphnaecus.

Description
It has an orange in colour throughout the entire body. It is 28mm long, or 30mm with chelicerae included. The fovea is procurved. The retrolateral face of the chelicerae is setae-less and the stridulatory setae on the maxillae are butter knife-shaped.

Behavior 
This is an obligate burrower tarantula, they are quite secretive thought they are usually found outside their burrows. They would rather flee than fight, and their usual hunting strategy is just to wait.

References

Theraphosidae
Spiders described in 1999
Spiders of Asia